Hinda Déby Itno (born 5 April 1980) is a former Chadian First Lady who served from 2005 until the death  of her husband, President Idriss Déby, in April 2021.

Biography
Itno was born in N'Djamena in 1980 to Mahamat and Mariam Abderahim Acyl. Her father was a diplomat who had worked at Chad's embassy in Washington D.C. He was Secretary of State for Public Health, Labor and Social Affairs from July 1976 to September 1978. Her father retired after serving several years as a consultant N'Djamena, but he was appointed Ambassador of Chad to Sudan in 2010.

On 2 October 2005 she became the wife of Chad's President and she was identified as the First Lady as he already had other wives.

In 2014 Chad's national council of women (CONAF-TCHAD) was formed with her strong support. Achta Djibrine Sy became the vice-president of that organisation which campaigned against discrimination.
 Itno admired Sy for her hard work. On 11 August 2019, Sy was appointed by Chad President Idriss Deby Itno to be the Minister of Commerce of Industry and Private Sector Promotion.

In 2017, by French decree, she was given French nationality together with her five children, who had all been born in France. Chad allows its nationals to have joint nationality.

Itno has been appointed a Special Ambassador for the Prevention of HIV by the American charity UNAIDS which aims to rid the disease by 2030.

References

1977 births
Living people
First ladies of Chad
People from N'Djamena
21st-century Chadian women politicians
21st-century Chadian politicians